Ira! (Portuguese for Anger! or Rage!, although the name was inspired by the Irish Republican Army) is a Brazilian rock band that was founded in São Paulo in the early 1980s. They were strongly influenced by the Mod sound of The Who, the hard rock of Led Zeppelin and the punk rock of The Clash.

History

Early years 

Led by singer Nasi and guitarist Edgard Scandurra, with Ricardo Gaspa on bass and André Jung on drums, Ira! was at the height of their success in the mid-to-late 1980s. Songs like "Núcleo Base", "Flores em Você" and "Envelheço na Cidade" were huge hits when first released and still enjoy considerable airplay in radio stations throughout Brazil. The band had a decline in productivity and popularity during the 1990s, but regained popularity after playing before an audience of over 250,000 at the third edition of the Rock in Rio festival in 2001 and doing an acoustic special for MTV Brasil in 2004.

2007: Internal Conflicts and Split 

In September 2007, just before the band were due to have a break, Nasi departed from the band after a conflict with Airton Valadão Rodolfo, who was the band manager and also Nasi's brother.

In November 2007, Edgard Scandurra announced that Ira! had split up and the remaining members would follow their careers separately.

2014: Reunion 

On 27 June 2012, Nasi and Airton announced to the press that they have been reconciled after more than five years of court and public battles. The brothers stated that they would settle all the pending legal prosecutions that one had target to the other. It was agreed that the brand 'Ira!', which was a property of Airton, would return to Nasi. The rumor of a possible Ira! reunion were denied, though. Nasi stated in his Facebook profile and on his personal blog that he had no immediate plan to reunite the group, although he was open get in good terms with Edgard Scandurra.

Discography
 Ira! (1983, released as a single)
 Mudança de Comportamento ("Change in Behaviour", full-length) (1985)
 Vivendo e Não Aprendendo ("You Live, You Don't Learn") (1986)
 Psicoacústica ("Psychoacoustics") (1988)
 Clandestino ("Clandestine") (1989)
 Meninos da Rua Paulo ("The Paulo Street Boys") (1991)
 Música Calma para Pessoas Nervosas ("Calm Music for Nervous People") (1993)
 7 (1996)
 Você Não Sabe Quem Eu Sou ("You Don't Know Who I Am") (1998)
 Isso É Amor ("That Is Love") (1999)
 MTV ao Vivo (2000)
 Entre Seus Rins ("Between Your Kidneys") (2001)
 Acústico MTV (2004)
 Invisível DJ ("Invisible DJ") (2007)

References

External links
 Official website

Musical groups established in 1981
Brazilian post-punk music groups
Musical groups disestablished in 2007
Brazilian alternative rock groups
Brazilian rock music groups
Brazilian punk rock groups
Musical groups from São Paulo
Musical quartets
1981 establishments in Brazil
2007 disestablishments in Brazil